Syritta stigmatica is a species of syrphid fly in the family Syrphidae.

Distribution
Ethiopia, Kenya, Mozambique, Nigeria.

References

Eristalinae
Diptera of Africa
Insects described in 1858
Taxa named by Hermann Loew